Prostanthera rhombea, commonly known as sparkling mint-bush, is a plant in the family Lamiaceae and is endemic to disjunct areas of south-eastern Australia. It is an openly-branched shrub with strongly aromatic branches, circular to heart-shaped leaves and mauve or bluish flowers.

Description

Taxonomy
Prostanthera rhombea was first formally described in 1810 by Robert Brown in his treatise Prodromus Florae Novae Hollandiae et Insulae Van Diemen.

Distribution and habitat
Sparkling mint-bush grows in rainforest and forest, often in gullies or near streams, mainly from Port Macquarie to the Nepean River in New South Wales and in low heath and woodland in rocky places in three isolated areas in Victoria - near Licola, Mount Timbertop near Mansfield and Mount Buffalo in Victoria.

References

rhombea
Flora of New South Wales
Flora of Victoria (Australia)
Lamiales of Australia
Plants described in 1810
Taxa named by Robert Brown (botanist, born 1773)